Amy Sadao is a contemporary art writer, juror, and lecturer who was director of the Institute of Contemporary Art in Philadelphia from September 2012 to September 2019. She oversaw the ICA's fiftieth anniversary as well as exhibitions of Nicole Eisenman, Ruanne Abbas, Jayson Musson, Alex Da Corte, Barbara Kasten, among others. Sadao was executive director of Visual AIDS in New York City prior to her appointment to the ICA directorship. She has been known to engage diverse communities and to center art around the contemporary social and political issues across the globe.

Biography
Born in California in 1971, Sadao grew up in Huntington Beach, California. She received her BFA from the Cooper Union School of Art in 1995 and an MA in comparative ethnic studies from the University of California, Berkeley in 2000. Around 2010, Sadao began dating poet Thomas Devaney who teaches at Haverford College. She currently lives in the Rittenhouse neighborhood.

Career 
Sadao began her career in museums as a curatorial intern at the Whitney Museum of American Art. At the Whitney museum, she worked with curator, Thelma Golden.

Sadao was the executive director of Visual AIDS in New York City for ten years, from 2002 through 2012. During her time at Visual AIDS, she increased outreach and expanded available resources surrounding HIV/AIDS to encourage discussion and support of HIV+ artists. In June 2012, she became the Director of the Institute of Contemporary Art (ICA).

University of Pennsylvania President Amy Gutmann and Provost Vincent Price announced her appointment to a directorship named for Daniel W. Dietrich II, honoring his substantial financial gift in 2005. In 2015, he also gave a US$10 million endowment to the university in support of its curatorial program and to help bring artists to Philadelphia. Describing her as "a leader of unparalleled energy and vision", Gutmann commented, "She has an especially strong commitment to forging collaborations across a wide range of diverse communities and placing art at the center of dialogue about the most significant intellectual, political, and social issues of the contemporary world." Price said, "I have been particularly impressed by her understanding of the role of art in a research university – and in catalyzing intellectual and interdisciplinary inquiry in general – as well as by the knowledge she brings of Penn and Philadelphia."

She was elected to the board of the Pennsylvania Humanities Council in 2015.

Awards
 2014: ArtTable New Leadership Awards

References

External links 
 Oral History Interview with Amy Sadao, Executive Director, Visual AIDS, September 10, 2010, Art Spaces Archives Project
 Amy Sadao on Imagine Otherwise podcast

University of Pennsylvania staff
Cooper Union alumni
University of California, Berkeley alumni
1971 births
Living people